Wallis Lapsley (born April 14, 1997) is an American soccer player who plays as a goalkeeper for MLS Next Pro club Tacoma Defiance.

Career
Lapsley was selected by the New York Red Bulls with the 36th pick in the second round of the 2020 MLS SuperDraft. In March 2020, Lapsley signed with the Red Bulls' USL Championship club New York Red Bulls II. He made his professional debut on March 7, starting in a 1–0 loss against Tampa Bay Rowdies. He was released by Red Bulls II on November 30, 2020. Lapsley signed with FC Tucson on February 4, 2021.

On March 18, 2022, it was announced that Lapsley had joined MLS Next Pro side Tacoma Defiance. On March 20, 2022, Lapsley made an emergency loan to Tacoma's Major League Soccer parent club Seattle Sounders FC for their fixture against Austin FC, where he made the bench.

References

External links
 UC Davis Aggies bio

1997 births
Living people
New York Red Bulls draft picks
New York Red Bulls II players
FC Tucson players
Soccer players from Seattle
USL Championship players
American soccer players
Association football goalkeepers
UC Davis Aggies men's soccer players
Des Moines Menace players
Tacoma Defiance players
Seattle Sounders FC players
MLS Next Pro players